A dippy egg may refer to:
 A soft-boiled egg
 An over-easy fried egg
 A Sunnyside up egg fried egg